The year 1971 in science and technology involved some significant events, listed below.

Astronomy and space exploration
 January 31 – Apollo program: Astronauts aboard Apollo 14 lift off for a mission to the Moon.
 February 5 – Apollo 14 lands on the Moon.
 February 9 – Apollo program: Apollo 14 returns to Earth after the third manned Moon landing.
 May 19 – Mars probe program: Mars 2 is launched by the Soviet Union.
 May 30 – Mariner program: Mariner 9 is launched toward Mars.
 June 30 – The crew of the Soyuz 11 spacecraft are killed when their air supply leaks out through a faulty valve during re-entry preparations, the only human deaths to occur outside Earth's atmosphere.
 July 26 – Apollo program: Launch of Apollo 15.  On July 31 the Apollo 15 astronauts become the first to ride in a lunar rover a day after landing on the Moon's surface.
 November 13 – Mariner program: Mariner 9 enters Mars orbit.

Biology
 July – Francis G. Howarth discovers communities of specialized thermophile cave animals living in lava tubes at Hawaii Volcanoes National Park. 
 C. A. W. Jeekel publishes Nomenclator Generum et Familiarum Diplopodorum.
 John O'Keefe discovers place cells in the mammalian brain.

Computer science
 July 4 – Michael S. Hart posts the first e-book, a copy of the United States Declaration of Independence, on the University of Illinois at Urbana–Champaign's mainframe computer, the origin of Project Gutenberg.
 November 3 – The Unix Programmer's Manual is published.
 November 15 – Intel release the world's first microprocessor, the 4004.
 November/December – Computer Space is released, the first arcade video game.
 Ray Tomlinson sends the first ARPAnet e-mail between host computers, at BBN, Cambridge, Massachusetts, with the first use of the @ sign in an address.
 Kenbak-1 goes on sale, considered to be the world's first personal computer by the Computer History Museum and the American Computer Museum.
 The earliest floppy disks, 8 inches in diameter, become commercially available as components of products shipped by IBM, their inventor.

Conservation
 February 2 – The international Ramsar Convention for the conservation and sustainable utilization of wetlands is signed in Ramsar, Mazandaran, Iran.

Earth sciences
 February 9 – The San Fernando (Sylmar) earthquake occurs in southern California with a magnitude of 6.6 and a perceived intensity of XI (extreme) on the Modified Mercalli intensity scale.

Mathematics
 Stephen Cook  introduces the concept of NP-completeness in computational complexity theory at the 3rd Annual ACM Symposium on Theory of Computing.
 Daniel Quillen publishes a proof of the Adams conjecture.
 Steven Takiff introduces Takiff algebras.

Medicine
 October 1 – Godfrey Hounsfield's invention, X-ray computed tomography, is first used on a patient with a cerebral cyst at Atkinson Morley Hospital in Wimbledon, London.
 Boston Women's Health Book Collective publishes Our Bodies, Ourselves in the U.S.
 E. G. L. Bywaters characterises adult-onset Still's disease, a rare form of inflammatory arthritis.
 Smallpox is eradicated from the Americas.

Physics
 Roger Penrose proposes the Penrose process.

Psychology
 August 14–20 – Stanford prison experiment.
 Konrad Lorenz publishes Studies in Animal and Human Behavior, Volume II.

Technology
 Richard H. Frenkiel, Joel S. Engel and Philip T. Porter of Bell Labs in the United States set out the parameters for a practical cellular telephone network.
 J. J. Stiffler publishes his book Theory of Synchronous Communications and edits a special issue of IEEE Transactions on Communication Technology on error correction codes.

Institutions
 Paris Descartes University begins to function in continuation of the medical department of the University of Paris.

Awards
 Nobel Prizes
 Physics – Dennis Gabor
 Chemistry – Gerhard Herzberg
 Medicine – Earl W Sutherland, Jr
 Turing Award – John McCarthy

Births
 May 29 – Howard Gobioff (d. 2008), American computer scientist.
 June 28 – Elon Musk, South African-born Canadian-American entrepreneur, engineer, inventor and investor.
 July 4 – Sivakumar Veerasamy, Indian plant geneticist.
 July 21 – Sara Seager, Canadian-American astrophysicist.
 August 2 – Ruth Lawrence, English-born mathematician.

Deaths
 January 25 – Donald Winnicott (b. 1896), English child psychiatrist.
 February 16 – Heinrich Willi (b. 1900), Swiss pediatrician.
 March 11 – Philo T. Farnsworth (b. 1906), American television pioneer.
 April 1 – Dame Kathleen Lonsdale (b. 1903), Irish-born crystallographer.
 April 6 – Margaret Newton (b. 1887), Canadian plant pathologist.
 June 6 – Edward Andrade (b. 1887), English physicist.
 June 30 – Soviet cosmonauts
 Georgy Dobrovolsky (b. 1928)
 Vladislav Volkov (b. 1935)
 Viktor Patsayev (b. 1933)

References

 
20th century in science
1970s in science